Hainan Adventure with Nigel Marven is one-hour British travel and nature documentary created by Image Impact production company for Eden and first broadcast in February 2012.

In the program, wildlife presenter Nigel Marven crosses Hainan Island in China in the footsteps of English explorer John Whitehead. Guided by Whitehead's journal, he journeys to South China Sea and Bawanling Reserve to explore pristine rainforests and meets a lot of different creatures, including Hainan silver pheasant. The highlight is encounter with one of the largest fruit bat roost in the world hidden under one roof.

Links 
 Fremantle Brand

Nature educational television series